Radio România Muzical is the fourth public-funded radio station in Romania. It is not available in all areas of the country.

It is the only Romanian radio station dedicated exclusively to jazz and classical music, and is the first Romanian radio station of its kind to be broadcast online. The station broadcasts music 24/7 of a variety of musical genres, including symphonic, chamber music, operetta, choral music, folk, jazz and soundtracks. It also broadcasts both live and archived concerts, featuring famous singers and ensembles, and provides news of national and international events.

Station programs 
 Info-bulletins about the most recent events in the Romanian and International music community.
 Programmes of initiations, educations and musical esthetics.
 Programmes which promote young talents.
 Interviews with great Romanian and International cultural personalities.
 Integrals of important composers and interpreters.
 Interactive shows where listeners may participate.
 Portraits of composers and interpreters.
 Live broadcasts from the Radio concert season and from all major national musical events.
 Live broadcasts from the world's major musical institutions and recordings from the EBU archive.
 The Euroclassic Notturno programme, taken from the European Broadcasting Union, for six hours (from 1 AM to 7 AM).
 Jazzy hour.
 Holiday specials.
 Broadcasting the information bulletin from Radio Romania News.

Frequencies
 104.8 FM Bucharest
 97.6 FM Regional frequency
 95.4 FM - Iasi

Online broadcast
Access is available to online live broadcasts as well as alternative online stations.

DAB Broadcast – Terrestrial Digital Radio
Radio România Muzical can be listened to via digital radios, only in Bucharest, on 223.936 MHz (channel 12).

References

External links
 Radio Romania Muzical Website in english

Radio stations in Romania
Romanian-language radio stations
Muzical